David Ferry (born March 5, 1924) is an American poet, translator, and educator. He has published eight collections of his poetry and a volume of literary criticism. He won the National Book Award for Poetry for his 2012 collection Bewilderment: New Poems and Translations.

Life
Ferry was born in Orange, New Jersey in March 1924, and grew up and attended Columbia High School amid the “wild hills” of suburban Maplewood, New Jersey.  
His undergraduate education at Amherst College was interrupted by his service in the United States Army Air Force during World War II. 
He ultimately received his B.A. from Amherst in 1946. He went on to earn his Ph.D. from Harvard University, and it was during his graduate studies that he published his first poems in The Kenyon Review.

From 1952 until his retirement in 1989, Ferry taught at Wellesley College where he was, for many years, the chairman of the English Department.  He now holds the title Sophie Chantal Hart Professor Emeritus of English at Wellesley.  He has also taught writing at Boston University, as well as Suffolk University, as a distinguished scholar. Ferry was elected a fellow of the American Academy of Arts and Sciences in 1998, and he is a fellow of the Academy of American Poets.

In 1958, Ferry married the distinguished literary scholar  Anne Ferry (died 2006), they had two children, Elizabeth, an anthropologist, and Stephen, a photojournalist.  
Before moving to his current home in Brookline, Massachusetts, Ferry lived across the Charles River in Cambridge, in the house where 19th century journalist and women's rights advocate Margaret Fuller lived before she joined the Brook Farm community.

Honors and awards

In 2000, Ferry's book of new and selected poems and translations, entitled Of No Country I Know, received the Lenore Marshall Poetry Prize from the Academy of American Poets and the Rebekah Johnson Bobbitt National Prize for Poetry from the Library of Congress (for the best work of poetry for the previous two years). 
He is the author of a critically praised verse rendering of the Mesopotamian Epic of Gilgamesh. 
The poet W. S. Merwin has described Ferry's work as having an "assured quiet tone" that communicates "complexities of feeling with unfailing proportion and grace."

Ferry is also a recipient of the Harold Morton Landon Translation Award.

In 2011, Ferry was awarded the Ruth Lilly Poetry Prize.

In 2012, Ferry was awarded the National Book Award for Poetry for his book Bewilderment (University of Chicago Press). Bewilderment was a finalist for the National Book Critics Circle Award (2012, Poetry).

Poetry and Translations

For many years, David Ferry has been admired in the US for his translations of Gilgamesh, Horace and Virgil. His original poetry has flourished in the shadow of this other work and he likes to juxtapose translations with his own poems in an acknowledgement of influence and tradition. Elegance, clarity, an avoidance of frills – the Horatian virtues – are important to him. He has written critically about Wordsworth and always intends to communicate with readers, approaching both translation and original work with a wise passivity, even humility, in pursuit of “the heartbeat easy governance / Of long continued metrical discipline” (‘A Thank-You Note’). This selection draws from his whole oeuvre, including ‘Poem’ (1960) which shows a young poet not wanting to howl or essay a barbaric yawp, but rather stiffly confined to New Formalist and Classical models, to inversion and Romantic lexis.

It was twenty three years before Ferry published his own poems again. ‘In the Garden’ suggests how elegance had now fused with vitality, formal skill with vivid responses to reality. The narrator sits reading Edward Thomas, engaged in “ill-informed staring” and observation nudges the poem forward: “The green of these leaves is almost an absence of green, / And the stalks look like rays of light under water”. Later Ferry poems meander, seem to have little intent on the reader, but brim with details, move like music. He understands the more we attend, whether to language or world, the more we discover we have missed. In ‘That Evening at Dinner’, one of the guests struggles with her “graceless leg, / The thick stocking, the leg brace”. Yet the poem ends by gazing at books on shelves: “Line after line, all of them evenly spaced, / And spaces between the words. You could fall through the spaces.” Here Ferry interpolates lines from Samuel Johnson on “chasms infinitely deep” that lie beneath the surface of things. It is not merely that –as the writer of ‘Old Man’ and ‘The Glory’ must have felt – we do not know these things, but that we do not have the “faculties” to know them.

Over and over, Ferry alludes to this “something”, elusive partly as the result of the ambivalent gifts of time. ‘Down by the River’ describes a scene's “participial rhythm, // Flowing, enjoying, taking its own sweet time”. But it is the shifting liquidity of water that most vividly evokes the ineffable, Ferry's real subject. ‘Lake Water’ declares “The plane of the water is like a page on which / Phrases and even sentences are written”. Yet as the poet tries to compose, “The surface of the page is like lake water” and later again all is “erased with the changing of the breeze”. For all their elegance and plain-speaking, these poems are marvellously unstable, modern, poignantly facing up to the limits of the faulty equipment we are given to understand the world. ‘The Intention of Things’ gently devastates with the idea that “death lives in the intention of things / To have a meaning”. Lesser poets might be reduced to silence, or tear language to shreds, but Ferry's provisional songs instruct, console, distract, remain to be admired. His collection, Bewilderment: New Poems and Translations, won the 2012 National Book Award: a fitting tribute to this 89-year-old outstanding poet, still singing “like the birds that gather in Virgil’s lines / In the park at evening, sitting among the branches” (‘The Birds’).

In 2017 his translation of Virgil's Aeneid, published at the age of 93, was reviewed at length by the academic and poet April Bernard in the New York Review of Books. She considered that, "he has some sort of uncanny connection to the great poet [i.e. Virgil ]", and suggested his translation was superior to those of John Dryden, Robert Fitzgerald and  Robert Fagles, because of its combination of vivid precision, metrical force, and cumulative effect. Writing in the TLS, classicist Richard Jenkyns called Ferry's Aeneid "the best modern version...both for its loyalty to the original and for its naturalness in itself."

List of works

 The Limits of Mortality: An Essay on Wordsworth's Major Poems Wesleyan University Press, 1959; Literary Licensing, LLC, 2011, 
 On the Way to the Island Wesleyan University Press, 1960,  
 
 Gilgamesh: A New Rendering in English Verse Farrar, Straus and Giroux, 1992,  
  
  
 The Eclogues of Virgil Farrar, Straus and Giroux, 2000,  
  
 The Georgics of Virgil (2005)
 On This Side of the River: Selected Poems, Between the Lines, 2012,  
 
  Virgil, The Aeneid. University of Chicago Press. 2017.

References

Living people
1924 births
American male poets
Amherst College alumni
Harvard University alumni
Fellows of the American Academy of Arts and Sciences
People from Orange, New Jersey
Wellesley College faculty
Latin–English translators
Formalist poets
Translators of Virgil
United States Army Air Forces personnel of World War II